Edmond Richard may refer to:
Edmond Richard (cinematographer) (1927–2018), cinematographer
Edmond Richard (writer), lover and biographer of Apollonie Sabatier